Tsang is a Chinese surname, particularly used by people from Hong Kong. It is written as 曾. The surname 曾 may also be romanised as "Zeng" (pinyin, China) and "Tang" (Vietnam).

Notable people with the name include:

 Aaron Tsang, Canadian composer
 Andy Tsang (born 1958), Commissioner of the Hong Kong Police Force
 Angie Tsang (born 1980), Hong Kong wushu athlete and child actress
 Beryl Tsang, Canadian fibre artist
 Bion Tsang (born 1967), American cellist and professor
 Bowie Tsang (born 1973), Taiwanese Mandopop singer and actress
 Daniel C. Tsang, American activist and scholar
 Derek Tsang (born 1979), Hong Kong actor and film director
 Donald Tsang (born 1944), Chief Executive of the HKSAR from 2005 to 2012
 Edward Tsang, computer science professor at the University of Essex
 Eric Tsang (born 1953), Hong Kong actor, film director, and producer
 Henry Tsang (born 1943), Australian architect and politician 
 Henry Tsang (artist) (born 1964), Hong Kong-Canadian contemporary artist
 Jasper Tsang (born 1947), 2nd President of the Legislative Council of Hong Kong
 Josephine Tsang Sau-ho, member of the Hong Kong District Council
 John Tsang (born 1951), Hong Kong civil servant and government official
 Kenneth Tsang (born 1935), Hong Kong actor
 Pansy Tsang (born 1969), Cantonese Chinese voice actress
 Stephen Tsang, Hong Kong-American ophthalmologist and geneticist
 Steve Tsang, Hong Kong-British political scientist and historian, director of the SOAS China Institute
 Tiki Tsang (born 1968), Australian actress and model
 Tosha Tsang (born 1970), Canadian rower
 Wu Tsang, filmmaker, artist and performer based in Los Angeles
 Tsang Chi Hau (born 1990), Hong Kong footballer
 Tsang Kam To (born 1989), Hong Kong footballer
 Tsang Kin Fong, Hong Kong footballer
 Tsang Kin-shing (born 1957), Hong Kong member of the Legislative Council
 Tsang Kin-Wah, Hong Kong visual artist
 Tsang Lap Chuen, Chinese philosopher in the analytic tradition
 Tsang Man Fai (born 1991), Hong Kong footballer
 Tsang Shu-ki (1950–2014), Hong Kong economist and social activist
 Tsang Siu-Fo (1923–2014), Chinese police officer of the Hong Kong police force
 Tsang Tak-sing (born 1949), Secretary for Home Affairs
 Tsang Tsou Choi (1921–2007), Hong Kong artist known for his calligraphy graffiti.
 Tsang Wai Chung, Hong Kong footballer
 Tsang Wing Sze (born 1972), Hong Kong swimmer
 Tsang Yam-pui (born 1946), Commissioner of Police of Hong Kong
 Tsang Yi Ming (born 1966), Hong Kong swimmer
 Wu Tsang (born 1981), American filmmaker

See also
 Zang (surname)
 Zeng, surname
 Tang (surname)
 Tsang (disambiguation)

Chinese-language surnames
Cantonese-language surnames